Gordon Ferry (born 22 December 1943) is an English former footballer who played in the Football League for Arsenal and Leyton Orient. He also had a short spell as manager of Barnet in 1974.

References

External links
 

English footballers
English Football League players
1943 births
Living people
Arsenal F.C. players
Leyton Orient F.C. players
Atlanta Chiefs players
Barnet F.C. players
Barnet F.C. managers
Association football defenders
English expatriate sportspeople in the United States
Expatriate soccer players in the United States
English expatriate footballers
English football managers